Ricardo Peral Antunez (born February 13, 1974) is a retired Spanish professional basketball player.

Early career
Peral started his career from Real Madrid Baloncesto youth teams. In 1991 he was promoted at the first team. He played in seven games, and he scored eight points.

College career
In 1994 Peral starting played for Wake Forest Demon Deacons men's basketball. His teammate for three years was Tim Duncan. Peral averaged 6.7 points per game at his first season. His sophomore season was his best with 9.4 points per game. Peral finished his college career in 1996–97 with a 7.6 points per game average.

Greece
In 1997, Peral signed a three year with P.A.O.K. BC. IHis best season was 1999–2000, when he had 5.9 points and 2.4 rebounds per game. In domestic competitions, he won the Greek Basketball Cup in 1999, and he played in two finals for the Greek Basketball League

National team
He was member of Spain national under-16 basketball team, Spain national under-18 basketball team and Spain national under-20 basketball team, and he won three medals.

References

External links
at fibaeurope.com
at esake.gr

1974 births
Living people
Liga ACB players
P.A.O.K. BC players
Real Madrid Baloncesto players
Spanish expatriate basketball people in the United States
Spanish expatriate sportspeople in Greece
Spanish men's basketball players
Sportspeople from Valladolid
Wake Forest Demon Deacons men's basketball players
Forwards (basketball)